The Tokugawa shogunate, also known as the , was the military government of Japan during the Edo period from 1603 to 1868.

The Tokugawa shogunate was established by Tokugawa Ieyasu after victory at the Battle of Sekigahara, ending the civil wars of the Sengoku period following the collapse of the Ashikaga shogunate. Ieyasu became the shōgun, and the Tokugawa clan governed Japan from Edo Castle in the eastern city of Edo (Tokyo) along with the daimyō lords of the samurai class. The Tokugawa shogunate organized Japanese society under the strict Tokugawa class system and banned most foreigners under the isolationist policies of Sakoku to promote political stability. The Tokugawa shoguns governed Japan in a feudal system, with each daimyō administering a han (feudal domain), although the country was still nominally organized as imperial provinces. Under the Tokugawa shogunate, Japan experienced rapid economic growth and urbanization, which led to the rise of the merchant class and Ukiyo culture.

The Tokugawa shogunate declined during the Bakumatsu ("final act of the shogunate") period from 1853 and was overthrown by supporters of the Imperial Court in the Meiji Restoration in 1868. The Empire of Japan was established under the Meiji government, and Tokugawa loyalists continued to fight in the Boshin War until the defeat of the Republic of Ezo at the Battle of Hakodate in June 1869.

History

Following the Sengoku period ("warring states period"), the central government had been largely re-established by Oda Nobunaga during the Azuchi–Momoyama period. After the Battle of Sekigahara in 1600, central authority fell to Tokugawa Ieyasu. While many daimyos who fought against Tokugawa Ieyasu were extinguished or had their holdings reduced, Ieyasu was committed to retaining the daimyos and the han (domains) as components under his new shogunate. Indeed, daimyos who sided with Ieyasu were rewarded, and some of Ieyasu's former vassals were made daimyos and were located strategically throughout the country.

Society in the Tokugawa period, unlike in previous shogunates, was supposedly based on the strict class hierarchy originally established by Toyotomi Hideyoshi. The daimyō (lords) were at the top, followed by the warrior-caste of samurai, with the farmers, artisans, and traders ranking below. In some parts of the country, particularly smaller regions, daimyō, and samurai were more or less identical, since daimyō might be trained as samurai, and samurai might act as local rulers. Otherwise, the largely inflexible nature of this social stratification system unleashed disruptive forces over time. Taxes on the peasantry were set at fixed amounts that did not account for inflation or other changes in monetary value. As a result, the tax revenues collected by the samurai landowners were worth less and less over time. This often led to numerous confrontations between noble but impoverished samurai and well-to-do peasants, ranging from simple local disturbances to much larger rebellions. None, however, proved compelling enough to seriously challenge the established order until the arrival of foreign powers. A 2017 study found that peasant rebellions and collective desertion ("flight") lowered tax rates and inhibited state growth in the Tokugawa shogunate.

In the mid-19th century, an alliance of several of the more powerful daimyō, along with the titular Emperor of Japan, succeeded in overthrowing the shogunate, which came to an official end in 1868 with the resignation of the 15th Tokugawa shogun, Tokugawa Yoshinobu, leading to the "restoration" (王政復古, Ōsei fukko) of imperial rule. Some loyal retainers of the shogun continued to fight during the Boshin war that followed but were eventually defeated. Notwithstanding its eventual overthrow in favour of the more modernized, less feudal form of governance of the Meiji Restoration, the Tokugawa shogunate oversaw the longest period of peace and stability in Japan's history, lasting well over 260 years.

Government

Shogunate and domains

The bakuhan system (bakuhan taisei ) was the feudal political system in the Edo period of Japan. Baku is an abbreviation of bakufu, meaning "military government"—that is, the shogunate. The han were the domains headed by daimyō. Beginning from Ieyasu's appointment as shogun in 1603, but especially after the Tokugawa victory in Osaka in 1615, various policies were implemented to assert the shogunate's control, which severely curtailed the daimyos''' independence. The number of daimyos varied but stabilized at around 270.

The bakuhan system split feudal power between the shogunate in Edo and the daimyōs with domains throughout Japan. The shōgun and lords were all daimyōs: feudal lords with their own bureaucracies, policies, and territories. Provinces had a degree of sovereignty and were allowed an independent administration of the han in exchange for loyalty to the shōgun, who was responsible for foreign relations, national security, coinage, weights, and measures, and transportation.

The shōgun also administered the most powerful han, the hereditary fief of the House of Tokugawa, which also included many gold and silver mines. Towards the end of the shogunate, the Tokugawa clan held around 7 million koku of land (天領 tenryō), including 2.6–2.7 million koku held by direct vassals, out of 30 million in the country. The other 23 million koku were held by other daimyos.

The number of han (roughly 270) fluctuated throughout the Edo period. They were ranked by size, which was measured as the number of koku of rice that the domain produced each year. One koku was the amount of rice necessary to feed one adult male for one year. The minimum number for a daimyō was ten thousand koku; the largest, apart from the shōgun, was more than a million koku.

 Policies to control the daimyos 
The main policies of the shogunate on the daimyos included:

 The principle was that each daimyo (including those who were previously independent of the Tokugawa family) submitted to the shogunate, and each han required the shogunate's recognition and was subject to its land redistributions. Daimyos swore allegiance to each shogun and acknowledged the Laws for Warrior Houses or buke shohatto.
 The sankin-kōtai (参勤交代 "alternate attendance") system, required daimyos to travel to and reside in Edo every other year, and for their families to remain in Edo during their absence.
 The ikkoku ichijyō rei (一国一城令), allowed each daimyo's han to retain only one fortification, at the daimyo's residence.
 The Laws for the Military Houses (武家諸法度, buke shohatto), the first of which is 1615 forbade the building of new fortifications or repairing existing ones without bakufu approval, admitting fugitives of the shogunate, and arranging marriages of the daimyos' families without official permission. Additional rules on the samurai were issued over the years.

Although the shogun issued certain laws, such as the buke shohatto on the daimyōs and the rest of the samurai class, each han administered its autonomous system of laws and taxation. The shōgun did not interfere in a han's governance unless major incompetence (such as large rebellions) is shown, nor were central taxes issued. Instead, each han provided feudal duties, such as maintaining roads and official currier stations, building canals and harbors, providing troops, and relieving famines. Daimyōs were strategically placed to check each other, and the sankin-kōtai system ensured that daimyōs or their family are always in Edo, observed by the shogun.

The shogunate had the power to discard, annex, and transform domains, although they were rarely and carefully exercised after the early years of the Shogunate, to prevent daimyōs from banding together. The sankin-kōtai system of alternative residence required each daimyō to reside in alternate years between the han and the court in Edo. During their absences from Edo, it was also required that they leave their family as hostages until their return. The hostages and the huge expenditure sankin-kōtai imposed on each han helped to ensure loyalty to the shōgun. By the 1690s, the vast majority of daimyos would be born in Edo, and most would consider it their homes. Some daimyos had little interest in their domains and needed to be begged to return "home".

In return for the centralization, peace among the daimyos was maintained; unlike in the Sengoku period, daimyos no longer worried about conflicts with one another. In addition, hereditary succession was guaranteed as internal usurpations within domains were not recognized by the shogunate.

 Classification of daimyos 
The Tokugawa clan further ensured loyalty by maintaining a dogmatic insistence on loyalty to the shōgun. Daimyos were classified into three main categories:

 Shinpan ("relatives" 親藩) were six clans established by sons of Ieyasu, as well as certain sons of the 8th and 9th shoguns, who were made daimyos. They would provide an heir to the shogunate if the shogun didn't have an heir.
 Fudai ("hereditary" 譜代) were mostly vassals of Ieyasu and the Tokugawa clan before the Battle of Sekigahara. They ruled their han (estate) and served as high officials in the shogunate, although their han tended to be smaller compared to the tozama domains.
 Tozama ("outsiders" 外様) were around 100 daimyos, most of whom became vassals of the Tokugawa clan after the Battle of Sekigahara. Some fought against Tokugawa forces, although some were neutral or even fought on the side of the Tokugawa clan, as allies rather than vassals. The tozama daimyos tend to have the largest han, with 11 of the 16 largest daimyos in this category.

The tozama daimyos who fought against the Tokugawa clan in the Battle of Sekigahara had their estate reduced substantially. They were often placed in mountainous or far away areas, or placed between most trusted daimyos. Early in the Edo period, the shogunate viewed the tozama as the least likely to be loyal; over time, strategic marriages and the entrenchment of the system made the tozama less likely to rebel. In the end, however, it was still the great tozama of Satsuma, Chōshū and Tosa, and to a lesser extent Hizen, that brought down the shogunate. These four states are called the Four Western Clans, or Satchotohi for short.

Relations with the Emperor

Regardless of the political title of the Emperor, the shōguns of the Tokugawa family controlled Japan. While the Emperor officially had the prerogative of appointing the shōgun and received generous subsidies, he had virtually no say in state affairs. The shogunate issued the Laws for the Imperial and Court Officials (kinchu narabini kuge shohatto 禁中並公家諸法度) to set out its relationship with the Imperial family and the kuge (imperial court officials), and specified that the Emperor should dedicate to scholarship and poetry. The shogunate also appointed a liaison, the Kyoto Shoshidai (Shogun's Representative in Kyoto), to deal with the Emperor, court and nobility.

Towards the end of the shogunate, however, after centuries of the Emperor having very little say in state affairs and being secluded in his Kyoto palace, and in the wake of the reigning shōgun, Tokugawa Iemochi, marrying the sister of Emperor Kōmei (r. 1846–1867), in 1862, the Imperial Court in Kyoto began to enjoy increased political influence. The Emperor would occasionally be consulted on various policies and the shogun even made a visit to Kyoto to visit the Emperor. Government administration would be formally returned from the shogun to the Emperor during the Meiji Restoration in 1868.

Shogun and foreign trade

Foreign affairs and trade were monopolized by the shogunate, yielding a huge profit. Foreign trade was also permitted to the Satsuma and the Tsushima domains. Rice was the main trading product of Japan during this time. Isolationism was the foreign policy of Japan and trade was strictly controlled. Merchants were outsiders to the social hierarchy of Japan and were thought to be greedy.

The visits of the Nanban ships from Portugal were at first the main vector of trade exchanges, followed by the addition of Dutch, English, and sometimes Spanish ships.

From 1603 onward, Japan started to participate actively in foreign trade. In 1615, an embassy and trade mission under Hasekura Tsunenaga was sent across the Pacific to Nueva España (New Spain) on the Japanese-built galleon San Juan Bautista. Until 1635, the Shogun issued numerous permits for the so-called "red seal ships" destined for the Asian trade.

After 1635 and the introduction of seclusion laws (sakoku), inbound ships were only allowed from China, Korea, and the Netherlands.

Shogun and Christianity

Followers of Christianity first began appearing in Japan during the 16th century. Oda Nobunaga embraced Christianity and the Western technology that was imported with it, such as the musket. He also saw it as a tool he could use to suppress Buddhist forces.
 
Though Christianity was allowed to grow until the 1610s, Tokugawa Ieyasu soon began to see it as a growing threat to the stability of the shogunate. As Ōgosho ("Cloistered Shōgun"), he influenced the implementation of laws that banned the practice of Christianity. His successors followed suit, compounding upon Ieyasu's laws. The ban of Christianity is often linked with the creation of the Seclusion laws, or Sakoku, in the 1630s.

 The Shogunate's income 
The primary source of the shogunate's income was the tax (around 40%) levied on harvests in the Tokugawa clan's personal domains (tenryō). No taxes were levied on domains of daimyos, who instead provided military duty, public works and corvee. The shogunate obtained loans from merchants, which were sometimes seen as forced donations, although commerce was often not taxed. Special levies were also imposed for infrastructure-building.

Institutions of the shogunate
The personal vassals of the Tokugawa shoguns were classified into two groups:

 the bannermen (hatamoto 旗本) had the privilege to directly approach the shogun;
 the housemen (gokenin 御家人) did not have the privilege of the shogun's audience.

By the early 18th century, out of around 22,000 personal vassals, most would have received stipends rather than domains.

Rōjū and wakadoshiyori
The rōjū were normally the most senior members of the shogunate. Normally, four or five men held the office, and one was on duty for a month at a time on a rotating basis. They supervised the ōmetsuke (who checked on the daimyos), machi-bugyō (commissioners of administrative and judicial functions in major cities, especially Edo),  (遠国奉行, the commissioners of other major cities and shogunate domains) and other officials, oversaw relations with the Imperial Court in Kyoto, kuge (members of the nobility), daimyō, Buddhist temples and Shinto shrines, and attended to matters like divisions of fiefs. Other bugyō (commissioners) in charge of finances, monasteries and shrines also reported to the rōjū. The roju conferred on especially important matters. In the administrative reforms of 1867 (Keiō Reforms), the office was eliminated in favor of a bureaucratic system with ministers for the interior, finance, foreign relations, army, and navy.

In principle, the requirements for appointment to the office of rōjū were to be a fudai daimyō and to have a fief assessed at  koku or more. However, there were exceptions to both criteria.

Irregularly, the shōguns appointed a rōjū to the position of tairō (great elder). The office was limited to members of the Ii, Sakai, Doi, and Hotta clans, but Yanagisawa Yoshiyasu was given the status of tairō as well. Among the most famous was Ii Naosuke, who was assassinated in 1860 outside the Sakuradamon Gate of Edo Castle (Sakuradamon incident).

Three to five men titled the wakadoshiyori (若年寄) were next in status below the rōjū. An outgrowth of the early six-man rokuninshū (六人衆, 1633–1649), the office took its name and final form in 1662. Their primary responsibility was management of the affairs of the hatamoto and gokenin, the direct vassals of the shōgun. Under the wakadoshiyori were the metsuke.

Some shōguns appointed a soba yōnin. This person acted as a liaison between the shōgun and the rōjū. The soba yōnin increased in importance during the time of the fifth shōgun Tokugawa Tsunayoshi, when a wakadoshiyori, Inaba Masayasu, assassinated Hotta Masatoshi, the tairō. Fearing for his personal safety, Tsunayoshi moved the rōjū to a more distant part of the castle. Some of the most famous soba yōnin were Yanagisawa Yoshiyasu and Tanuma Okitsugu.

Ōmetsuke and metsuke
The ōmetsuke and metsuke were officials who reported to the rōjū and wakadoshiyori. The five ōmetsuke were in charge of monitoring the affairs of the daimyōs, kuge and imperial court. They were in charge of discovering any threat of rebellion. Early in the Edo period, daimyōs such as Yagyū Munefuyu held the office. Soon, however, it fell to hatamoto with rankings of 5,000 koku or more. To give them authority in their dealings with daimyōs, they were often ranked at 10,000 koku and given the title of kami (an ancient title, typically signifying the governor of a province) such as Bizen-no-kami.

As time progressed, the function of the ōmetsuke evolved into one of passing orders from the shogunate to the daimyōs, and of administering to ceremonies within Edo Castle. They also took on additional responsibilities such as supervising religious affairs and controlling firearms. The metsuke, reporting to the wakadoshiyori, oversaw the affairs of the vassals of the shōgun. They were the police force for the thousands of hatamoto and gokenin who were concentrated in Edo. Individual han had their own metsuke who similarly policed their samurai.

San-bugyō
The san-bugyō (三奉行 "three administrators") were the jisha, kanjō, and machi-bugyō, which respectively oversaw temples and shrines, accounting, and the cities. The jisha-bugyō had the highest status of the three. They oversaw the administration of Buddhist temples (ji) and Shinto shrines (sha), many of which held fiefs. Also, they heard lawsuits from several land holdings outside the eight Kantō provinces. The appointments normally went to daimyōs; Ōoka Tadasuke was an exception, though he later became a daimyō.

The kanjō-bugyō were next in status. The four holders of this office reported to the rōjū. They were responsible for the finances of the shogunate.

The machi-bugyō were the chief city administrators of Edo and other cities. Their roles included mayor, chief of the police (and, later, also of the fire department), and judge in criminal and civil matters not involving samurai. Two (briefly, three) men, normally hatamoto, held the office, and alternated by month.

Three Edo machi bugyō have become famous through jidaigeki (period films): Ōoka Tadasuke and Tōyama Kagemoto (Kinshirō) as heroes, and Torii Yōzō (:ja:鳥居耀蔵) as a villain.

Tenryō, gundai and daikan
The san-bugyō together sat on a council called the hyōjōsho (評定所). In this capacity, they were responsible for administering the tenryō (the shogun's estates), supervising the gundai (郡代), the daikan (代官) and the kura bugyō (蔵奉行), as well as hearing cases involving samurai. The gundai managed Tokugawa domains with incomes greater than 10,000 koku while the daikan managed areas with incomes between 5,000 and 10,000 koku.

The shogun directly held lands in various parts of Japan. These were known as shihaisho (支配所); since the Meiji period, the term tenryō (天領, literally "Emperor's land") has become synonymous, because the shogun's lands were returned to the emperor. In addition to the territory that Ieyasu held prior to the Battle of Sekigahara, this included lands he gained in that battle and lands gained as a result of the Summer and Winter Sieges of Osaka. Major cities as Nagasaki and Osaka, and mines, including the Sado gold mine, also fell into this category.

Gaikoku bugyō

The gaikoku bugyō were administrators appointed between 1858 and 1868. They were charged with overseeing trade and diplomatic relations with foreign countries, and were based in the treaty ports of Nagasaki and Kanagawa (Yokohama).

Late Tokugawa shogunate (1853–1867)

The late Tokugawa shogunate ( Bakumatsu) was the period between 1853 and 1867, during which Japan ended its isolationist foreign policy called sakoku and modernized from a feudal shogunate to the Meiji government. It is at the end of the Edo period and preceded the Meiji era. The major ideological and political factions during this period were divided into the pro-imperialist Ishin Shishi (nationalist patriots) and the shogunate forces, including the elite shinsengumi ("newly selected corps") swordsmen.

Although these two groups were the most visible powers, many other factions attempted to use the chaos of the Bakumatsu era to seize personal power. Furthermore, there were two other main driving forces for dissent; first, growing resentment of tozama daimyōs, and second, growing anti-Western sentiment following the arrival of a U.S. Navy fleet under the command of Matthew C. Perry (which led to the forced opening of Japan). The first related to those lords who had fought against Tokugawa forces at Sekigahara (in 1600) and had from that point on been exiled permanently from all powerful positions within the shogunate. The second was to be expressed in the phrase sonnō jōi ("revere the Emperor, expel the barbarians"). The end for the Bakumatsu was the Boshin War, notably the Battle of Toba–Fushimi, when pro-shogunate forces were defeated.

List of Tokugawa shōguns

Family Tree

Over the course of the Edo period, influential relatives of the shogun included:
 Tokugawa Mitsukuni of the Mito Domain
 Tokugawa Nariaki of the Mito Domain
 Tokugawa Mochiharu of the Hitotsubashi branch
 Tokugawa Munetake of the Tayasu branch.
 Matsudaira Katamori of the Aizu branch.
 Matsudaira Sadanobu, born into the Tayasu branch, adopted into the Hisamatsu-Matsudaira of Shirakawa.
 Tokugawa Mochiharu of the Hitotsubashi branch.

See also

 Keian uprising

Notes

References
 Nussbaum, Louis-Frédéric and Käthe Roth. (2005). Japan Encyclopedia. Cambridge: Harvard University Press. ; OCLC 48943301

Further reading
 Bolitho, Harold. (1974). Treasures Among Men: The Fudai Daimyo in Tokugawa Japan. New Haven: Yale University Press. ; OCLC 185685588
 Haga, Tōru, translated by Juliet Winters Carpenter. Pax Tokugawana: The Cultural Flowering of Japan, 1603–1853. Tokyo: Japan Publishing Industry Foundation for Culture. 
 Totman, Conrad. The Collapse of the Tokugawa Bakufu, 1862–1868. Honolulu: University of Hawai'i Press, 1980.
 Totman, Conrad. Politics in the Tokugawa Bakufu, 1600–1843. Cambridge: Harvard University Press, 1967.
 Waswo, Ann Modern Japanese Society 1868–1994 The Center for East Asian Cultural Studies Meiji Japan Through Contemporary Sources, Volume Two 1844–1882''

External links
 Japan
 Tokugawa Political System 
 SengokuDaimyo.com The website of Samurai Author and Historian Anthony J. Bryant
 Narrative of the Expedition of an American Squadron to the China Seas and Japan, by M.C. Perry, at archive.org

States and territories established in 1600
States and territories disestablished in 1868

1600 establishments in Japan
1868 disestablishments in Japan
17th century in Japan
18th century in Japan
19th century in Japan